The Montgomery Street–Columbus Circle Historic District is located in Syracuse, New York.  It was added to the National Register of Historic Places in 1980.

Contributing properties

References

Neoclassical architecture in New York (state)
Beaux-Arts architecture in New York (state)
Renaissance Revival architecture in New York (state)
Neighborhoods in Syracuse, New York
Historic districts in Onondaga County, New York
Buildings and structures in Syracuse, New York
Historic districts on the National Register of Historic Places in New York (state)
National Register of Historic Places in Syracuse, New York